The Cordiner Peaks are a group of peaks extending over an area of , standing  southwest of Dufek Massif in the northern part of the Pensacola Mountains. They were discovered and photographed on January 13, 1956, in the course of a transcontinental nonstop plane flight by personnel of U.S. Navy Operation Deep Freeze I from McMurdo Sound to the Weddell Sea and return. They were named by the Advisory Committee on Antarctic Names for Captain Douglas L. Cordiner, U.S. Navy, an observer on the P2V-2N Neptune aircraft making this flight. The entire Pensacola Mountains were mapped by the United States Geological Survey in 1967 and 1968 from ground surveys and from U.S. Navy tricamera aerial photographs taken in 1964.

Features
Geographical features include:

 Jaburg Glacier
 Jackson Peak
 Rosser Ridge
 Sumrall Peak

References 

Mountains of Queen Elizabeth Land
Pensacola Mountains